Crosslandia daedali is a species of sea slug within the family Scyllaeidae, found in subtropical waters in the Eastern Central Pacific Ocean in Mexico and Costa Rica. It lives in benthic environments, usually on algae within the genus Padina where it grazes on small hydroids.

Description 
Crosslandia daedali grows to a length of 2.5 centimeters. Its color is described as being a greenish brown-orange, with brown and white lines on the sides and underside of the lobes. 6 small blue spots are found along the middle of the body, with most of them having fine black borders.

References

External links
 Poorman, L. H.; Mulliner, D. K. (1981). A new species of Crosslandia (Nudibranchia Dendronotacea) from the Gulf of California. Nautilus. 95(2): 96-99
 Behrens D.W. (2004) Pacific Coast nudibranchs, Supplement II. New species to the Pacific Coast and new information on the oldies. Proceedings of the California Academy of Sciences (4) 55(2): 11–54

Gastropods described in 1981
Scyllaeidae
Molluscs of the Pacific Ocean